The Comendador Ho Yin Garden is a small garden located in a residential area of Sé, Macau, China, named after Ho Yin.

History 
Comendador Ho Yin Garden was designed by Francisco Caldeira Cabral, opened by the last Governor of Macau Vasco Joaquim Rocha Vieira on 9 October 1993 with the name of Heung Shan Garden or Heung Shan Plaza.

The garden was renamed on 22 November 1996 by Municipal Council of Macau to commemorate Ho Yin's devotion to Portuguese-Chinese friendship.

Starting from May 2005, Macau Government started work to renovate the park, including to building a multi-story garage under the park and to cut off the park in order to connect Rua De Pequim and Rua de Luís Gonzaga Gomes.

The garden was gated until June 2007 after the renovation finished, only to be with gates erected again in 2015.

Features 
The park is located on Avenida de Amizade and features the Orient Arch as the central piece.

The park's features include:
 concrete chess tables
 benches
 playground
 gardens
 cafe

See also
 List of tourist attractions in Macau

References

Gardens in Macau
1993 establishments in Macau